Alfred George Stephens (28 August 1865 – 15 April 1933), commonly referred to as A. G. Stephens, was an Australian writer and literary critic, notably for The Bulletin. He was appointed to that position by its owner, J. F. Archibald in 1894.

Early life and journalism
Stephens was born at Toowoomba, Queensland. His father, Samuel George Stephens, came from Swansea, Wales, and his mother, originally Euphemia Russell, was born in Greenock, Scotland.  The first enrolled boy, he was educated at Toowoomba Grammar School until he was 15, and had a good grounding in English, French, and the classics, but his education was later much extended by wide reading. His father was part-owner of the Darling Downs Gazette, and in its composing room the boy developed his first interest in printing.

On leaving school he was employed in the printing department of William Henry Groom, proprietor of the Toowoomba Chronicle, and later in the business of A. W. Beard, printer and bookbinder of George Street, Sydney. He was learning much that was to be invaluable to him in his later career as journalist and editor. He returned to Queensland and in 1889 was editor of The Gympie Miner. A year or two later he became sub-editor of The Boomerang at Brisbane, which had been founded by William Lane in 1887, but though this journal had able contributors it fell into financial trouble, and in 1891 Stephens went to Cairns to become editor and part proprietor of the  Cairns Argus.

On the Boomerang he had had valuable experience as a reviewer of literature, on the Argus he enlarged his knowledge of Queensland politics. In 1892 he won a prize of £25 for an essay "Why North Queensland Wants Separation", published in 1893, and in this year was also published "The Griffilwraith" ('An Independent Criticism of the Methods and
Manoeuvres of the Queensland Coalition. Government, 1890–1893'), an able piece of pamphleteering attacking the coalition of the old rivals, Sir Samuel Griffith and Sir Thomas McIlwraith.

The Bulletin

In April 1893 having sold his share in the Cairns paper he left Australia for San Francisco, travelled across the continent, and thence to Great Britain and France. He had begun to do some journalistic work in London when he received the offer from J. F. Archibald of a position on The Bulletin.  He returned to Australia and arrived at Sydney in January 1894. His account of his travels, "A Queenslander's Travel Notes", published in that year, though bright enough in its way suggests a curiously insensitive Stephens.

Stephens began work on The Bulletin as a sub-editor, and it was not until after the middle of 1896 that he developed the famous "Red Page" reviews of literature printed on the inside of the cover. They were at first little concerned with work done in Australia, but as the years went by Australians were given their due share of the space.

Stephens was an active editor between the years 1897–1904, working on sixteen books of poetry, as well as Such is Life,  On Our Selection and Bulletin Story Book.  But Stephens was also acting as a literary agent, and in this way came in touch with and influenced much the rising school of Australian poets. He prepared for publication in 1897 a collected edition of the verses of Barcroft Boake, with a sympathetic and able account of his life, and during the next 20 years he saw through the press, volumes of verse by Arthur Henry Adams, Will H. Ogilvie, Roderic Quinn, James Hebblethwaite, Hubert Newman Wigmore Church, Bernard O'Dowd, Charles H. Souter, Robert Crawford, Shaw Neilson and others. In prose he recognised the value of Joseph Furphy's Such is Life, and succeeded in getting it published in spite of the realisation of The Bulletin's proprietary that money would be lost in doing so.

Later career

In September 1906, newspapers suggested Stephens was going to London where it was expected he would remain, but this was confusion with another Stephens.  In October 1906 however 'Red Page' Stephens had left The Bulletin; the exact occasion for the break has never been known.  He then set himself up initially running a bookshop.  For the remaining 27 years of his life Stephens was a freelance writer except for a brief period as a leader writer on the Wellington Post in 1907.

While he was with The Bulletin he had published a small volume of his own verses, "Oblation", in 1902; "The Red Pagan", a collection of his criticisms from the "Red Page" appeared in 1904, and a short but interesting biography of Victor Daley in the same year. He had also brought out five numbers of a little literary magazine called The Bookfellow in 1899. This was revived as a weekly for some months in 1907, and with variations in the title, numbers appeared at intervals until 1925. He supported himself by freelance journalism, by lecturing, he visited Melbourne and gave a course of four lectures on Australian poets in 1914, and by acting as a literary agent. His quest of a living was a constant struggle, but he never complained. He was joint author with Albert Dorrington of a novel, "The Lady Calphurnia Royal", published in 1909, in 1911 a collection of prose and verse, "The Pearl and the Octopus", appeared, and in 1913 "Bill's Idees", sketches about a reformed Sydney larrikin. A collection of his interviews was published in 1921, "School Plays" in 1924, a short account of Henry Kendall in 1928, and just before his own death a biography of Christopher Brennan.

Stephens died suddenly at Sydney, on 15 April 1933. He had married Constance Ivingsbelle Smith in 1894, who survived him with two sons and four daughters. A collection of his prose writings with an introductory memoir by Vance Palmer, A. G. Stephens: His Life and Work, was published in 1941. An interesting collection of his manuscripts is at the Mitchell Library, Sydney.

A. G. Stephens wrote a fair amount of verse, for which he claimed no more than that it was "quite good rhetorical verse". He was an excellent interviewer because he was really interested in his subjects, and he was a remarkably good critic, largely because he had an original analytic mind, and also because he fully realised how difficult the art of criticism is.

Notes

References

Bibliography
 Cantrell, Leon (ed.) (1977). A. G. Stephens : selected writings. Angus and Robertson. .
 Lindsay, Norman. (1973). 'A. G. Stephens' in Bohemians of the Bulletin. Angus and Robertson. . Lindsay's portrait of A. G. Stephens the man is unflattering: Lindsay writes that there was 'an enmity' between them that lasted until Stephens' death. Nonetheless, Lindsay firmly declares Stephens' 'important place in the literary tradition of this country.'
 Miller, E. Morris. (1973). Australian literature from its beginnings to 1935 : a descriptive and bibliographical survey of books by Australian authors in poetry, drama, fiction, criticism and anthology with subsidiary entries to 1938. Sydney University Press. 
 Palmer, Vance. (1941) A. G. Stephens, His Life and Work. Melbourne, Robertson and Mullins.
 Stephensen, P. R. (1940). The life and works of A.G. Stephens ("The Bookfellow") : a lecture, delivered to the Fellowship of Australian Writers, Sydney, 10 March 1940. Self-published.
 Rolfe, Patricia. (1979). 'Rhadamanthus of the Red Page' in The Journalistic Javelin. Sydney, Wildcat Press. .
 The Sydney Morning Herald, 17 April 1933

External links
 
 
 

1865 births
1933 deaths
Australian biographers
Male biographers
Australian magazine editors
People educated at Toowoomba Grammar School
Australian literary critics
Australian publishers (people)